The Castaibert II was Pablo Castaibert's second aircraft, powered by a   Anzani 24.5hp 3-cyl fan engine and reached . After building a Demoisselle style monoplane, which was unsuccessful, Castaibert built a Bleriot style monoplane which was successfully flown.

Specifications (Castaibert II)

References

1910s Argentine aircraft